Behind the Wall of Sleep may refer to:

 Behind the Wall of Sleep (EP), a 1994 EP by Macabre
 "Behind the Wall of Sleep" (The Smithereens song), 1986
 "Behind the Wall of Sleep", a song from Black Sabbath's 1970 album Black Sabbath

See also
 Beyond the Wall of Sleep (disambiguation)